André Tiago Carneiro Soares (born 5 March 1990) is a Portuguese footballer who plays for Vilaverdense F.C. as a forward.

Club career
Born in Vieira do Minho, Braga District, Soares started playing football with local Vieira S.C. at age 10. He finished his development with S.L. Benfica, having signed in 2004.

Subsequently, Benfica offered Soares a professional contract and loaned him to A.D. Carregado, who were having their first-ever experience in the Segunda Liga. He made his professional debut on 15 November, coming on as a late substitute in a 1–0 away loss against C.D. Feirense. He moved to third-division club Atlético Clube de Portugal on loan for the second part of the season.

In June 2010, still owned by Benfica, Soares joined Servette FC of the Swiss Challenge League. He reunited with former Benfica youth coach João Alves, being sparingly used during the campaign.

On 31 August 2011, Soares moved to C.S. Marítimo as a free agent. He appeared solely for the reserve side during his tenure, helping them win promotion to the second tier in 2012.

Subsequently, Soares continued to compete in division three, with F.C. Famalicão and Vilaverdense FC. He had a brief return to the second tier in June 2015 after signing with Gil Vicente FC, who described him as a "technically gifted player", but returned to his previous team only six months later.

International career
Soares helped the Portuguese under-16 side reach the final of the Val-de-Marne Tournament in October 2005. He also appeared for the nation during the qualifying stage for the 2007 UEFA European Under-17 Championship.

References

External links

1990 births
Living people
People from Vieira do Minho
Sportspeople from Braga District
Portuguese footballers
Association football forwards
Liga Portugal 2 players
Segunda Divisão players
S.L. Benfica footballers
Atlético Clube de Portugal players
C.S. Marítimo players
F.C. Famalicão players
Vilaverdense F.C. players
Gil Vicente F.C. players
F.C. Vizela players
Swiss Challenge League players
Servette FC players
Portugal youth international footballers
Portuguese expatriate footballers
Expatriate footballers in Switzerland
Portuguese expatriate sportspeople in Switzerland